Fahrudin "Fahro" Konjhodžić (13 January 1931 – 26 May 1984) was a Bosnian film and television actor.

Death
Konjhodžić died in 1984 after a long illness, aged 53.

Selected filmography

Stojan Mutikaša (1954)
Martin in the Clouds (1961)
The Emperor's New Clothes (1961)
Šeki snima, pazi se (1962)
Monday or Tuesday (1966)
Illusion (1967)
Handcuffs (1969)
An Event (1969)
Love and Some Swear Words (1969)
Passing Days (1970)
The Master and Margaret (1972)
 The Bloody Vultures of Alaska (1973)
Anno Domini 1573 (1975)
The Rat Savior (1976)
Occupation in 26 Pictures (1978)
Meetings with Remarkable Men (1979)
The Marathon Family (1982)
Memed, My Hawk (1984)

References

External links

1931 births
1984 deaths
Male actors from Sarajevo
Bosniaks of Bosnia and Herzegovina
Bosnia and Herzegovina Muslims
20th-century Bosnia and Herzegovina male actors